George Washington Smith (August 18, 1846 – November 30, 1907) was a U.S. Representative from Illinois.

Born in Putnam County, Ohio, Smith moved with his father to Wayne County, Illinois, in 1850.
Learned the blacksmith trade.
He  also attended the common schools.  In 1868 he graduated from the literary department of McKendree College.  After this he studied law in Fairfield, Illinois.

He then went to Indiana University where he received a law degree in 1870.
He was admitted to the bar the same year and commenced practice in Murphysboro, Illinois.
He served as master in chancery 1880-1888.

He married M. Alice Dailey. She was born at Murphysboro, Illinois, where she lived with her parents until her marriage with George W. Smith, then a brilliant young lawyer.

Smith was elected as a Republican to the Fifty-first and to the nine succeeding Congresses and served from March 4, 1889, until his death in Murphysboro, Illinois, November 30, 1907, before the convening of the Sixtieth Congress.
He served as chairman of the Committee on Private Land Claims (Fifty-fourth through Fifty-ninth Congresses).
He was interred in the City Cemetery.

See also

List of United States Congress members who died in office (1900–49)

References

Specific

External links

George Washington Smith, late a representative from Illinois, Memorial addresses delivered in the House of Representatives and Senate frontispiece 1909

1846 births
1907 deaths
Illinois state court judges
People from Putnam County, Ohio
Indiana University Maurer School of Law alumni
McKendree University alumni
Republican Party members of the United States House of Representatives from Illinois
19th-century American politicians
19th-century American judges